Ramonville-Saint-Agne, commonly known as Ramonville, is a commune in the suburbs of Toulouse, located in the French department of Haute-Garonne, administrative region of Occitanie, France.

Population

The inhabitants of the commune are known as Ramonvillois.

History and Economy
Politically, this commune has a historical affinity with the left-wing parties. Its economy is linked to the social work association ASEI.

Twin Towns
Ramonville-Saint-Agne is twinned with:
 Karben, Germany
 Zuera, Spain

See also
Communes of the Haute-Garonne department

References

Communes of Haute-Garonne